Benedict Chepeshi (born 10 June 1996) is a Zambian professional footballer who plays as a defender for Red Arrows and the Zambia national football team.

References 
 

1996 births
Living people
Zambian footballers
Zambia international footballers
Red Arrows F.C. players
Association football defenders
Zambia A' international footballers
2020 African Nations Championship players